The 2022–23 Florida State Seminoles women's basketball team, variously Florida State or FSU, represented Florida State University during the 2022–23 NCAA Division I women's basketball season.  They were led by second year head coach Brooke Wyckoff, who previously served as interim head coach for the team during the 2020–21 season. The Seminoles played their home games at the Donald L. Tucker Center on the university's Tallahassee, Florida campus. They competed as members of the Atlantic Coast Conference.

Previous season

The Seminoles finished the season 17–14 overall and 10–8 in ACC play to finish in a three-way tie for seventh place.  As the ninth seed in the ACC Tournament, they defeated eighth seed Boston College in the Second Round before losing to eventual champions, and first seed NC State in the Quarterfinals.  They received an at-large bid to the NCAA Tournament, marking the ninth consecutive year the team has qualified for the tournament.  As an eleven seed, the team played a First Four match against , which they lost, 51–60, to end their season.

On March 21, 2022, Semrau announced her retirement after 24 seasons as FSU. She was succeeded by Seminoles associate head coach Brooke Wyckoff, who served as the interim head coach for the team during the 2020–21 season during Semrau's leave of absence.

Off-season

Departures

Incoming Transfers

2022 recruiting class

Source:

Roster

Schedule and results

Source:

|-
!colspan=6 style="background:#; color:white;"| Exhibition

|-
!colspan=6 style="background:#; color:white;"| Non-Conference Regular season

|-
!colspan=6 style="background:#; color:white;"| ACC Regular season

|-
!colspan=6 style="background:#; color:white;"| ACC Women's Tournament

|-
!colspan=6 style="background:#; color:white;"| NCAA Women's Tournament

|-

Rankings

Awards

Watchlists

Honors

References

External links
 

Florida State Seminoles women's basketball
Florida State
Florida State Seminoles women's basketball seasons
Florida State women's basketball
Florida State women's basketball
Florida State